Max Daniel Winkler (born August 18, 1983) is an American screenwriter and film and television director. His credits include directing the film Ceremony (2010), starring Michael Angarano and Uma Thurman. The film was Winkler's feature film directorial debut.

Personal life and education
Born in Los Angeles, California, he is the son of Stacey Weitzman and actor Henry Winkler. He is of Jewish descent, and his grandparents were Holocaust survivors. As a child, he had a small role in the 1993 film Cop and a Half, a film his father directed. 

He graduated from the USC School of Cinematic Arts in 2006. 

On October 13, 2021, Winkler had his first child, a daughter named Frankie, with wife Jessica Barden.

Filmography

Director
Clark and Michael (TV series, also producer, 2006)
The King of Central Park (short film, also producer and writer, 2006)
Wainy Days (TV series, also co-writer for the episode "Dorvid Days", 2007)
Ceremony (also writer, 2010)
The New Normal (TV series, four episodes, 2012)
New Girl (TV series, three episodes, 2013)
Fresh Off the Boat (TV series, 1 episode, 2015)
The Grinder (TV series, 1 episode, 2015)
Casual (TV series, 2 episodes)
Flower (also writer, 2017)
 Crazy Ex-Girlfriend (1 episode, 2017)
 Jungleland (also writer, 2019)
 Cruel Summer (1 episode, 2021)
 American Horror Stories (2 episodes)
 American Horror Story (1 episode, 2021)
 The Watcher (1 episode, 2022)

Producer
Ten Fingers (short film, executive producer, 2010)
Cat Run (executive producer, 2011)
It's Not You It's Me (2012)

Other credits
Cop and a Half (actor, 1993)
A Cut Above (short film, production designer, 2006)
Arrested Development (actor, 2013)

References

External links

1983 births
Living people
Writers from Los Angeles
Film producers from California
American people of German-Jewish descent
American male screenwriters
American television directors
Jewish American writers
USC School of Cinematic Arts alumni
Male actors from Los Angeles
American male child actors
20th-century American male actors
21st-century American male actors
American male television actors
American male film actors
Crossroads School alumni
Film directors from Los Angeles
Screenwriters from California
21st-century American Jews